was an architect who created the prototype of the Imperial Crown Style for the Japanese Empire. He was a native of Akita, in northern Honshu, and moved to Tokyo in 1881, when he was fifteen. At Keio University, he enrolled in an architecture course under Josiah Conder.

Early years
Kikutarō Shimoda was born in 1886, was the eldest son of Satake clansman, Junchū Shimoda, in Kakunodate, Akita (now part of Semboku, Akita, Japan. Out of the 1000 entrance exam participants, Shimoda passed the exams placed 47th out of the top fifty passing entrants.

Tertiary education
In 1885 having passed the entrance exams, Shimoda enrolled in the School of Architecture at the Imperial College of Engineering, along with Tamisuke Yokogawa. Not satisfied with Tatsuno Kingo's lectures, who had recently returned from studying in the United Kingdom, Shimoda also took lectures from Hanroku Yamaguchi, who had been conducting lectures on French School architecture, which was not a mainstream architectural movement, at the Department of Education. In 1889 his father died suddenly, and Shimoda took out an Army scholarship-loan.

Shimoda gradually developed an inclination toward the theory of Evolution and the field of biology, and began to show disinterest in his college studies. Due to this, when graduation approached, Shimoda did not get along with his academic supervisor Tasuno Kingo, which became an obstacle to negotiating his final graduation design, in turn Shimoda did not complete his university studies. Out of Hanroku Yamaguchi's good will, who was then the head of the technical maintenance department at the Ministry of Education, allowed Shimoda to be employed at the Ministry. Shimoda published his translation of  European and American General Architecture, which was an architectural review introducing residential housing.

Career in America
Upon his arrival in America, he took up employment at the New York offices of A. Page Brown. In 1892 Shimoda submitted a personal entry in the architectural design competition for the California Pavilion at the 1893 World's Columbian Exposition, he lost to Brown, but moved to Chicago to take up a position as Construction Site Deputy Manager, improving his professional experience. While managing the California Pavilion construction site, Shimoda studied steel frame construction methods, under Daniel Burnham who was General Manager of site construction for the Exposition.

Wishing to further his study of steel-frame construction, he took up employment at D.H. Burnham & Company, which allowed him to work on steel-frame construction projects such as Reliance Building, Western Union Telegraphy Building, the Great Northern Hotel and Marshall Field department store. In May 1895, at the Illinois Cook County Court, Shimoda became a naturalized citizen of the United States, thereafter he left founded the offices of G.K. Shimoda located in the Monadnock Building on West Jackson Boulevard, Chicago. It was during the Autumn of 1896 that Shimoda married an American citizen named Rose, who was employed as Frank Lloyd Wright's secretary. During his time in Chicago, he had briefly worked under Frank Lloyd Wright.

In September 1897, Shimoda became the first Japanese national to pass the American Institute of Architects exam. Shimoda became well known among the Japanese expatriate community in Chicago, and received visits from Japanese nationals visiting the area. When he received a visit from Katayama Tōkuma, the chief engineer to the Imperial House of Japan for the construction of Akasaka Palace, Shimoda introduced him to Daniel Burnham. In 1909, for this service to the Imperial Household, Shimoda would receive a grace-and-favor payment of 500 yen in gold.

Return to Japan
In 1898, he returned with his wife to Yokohama, where he involved himself in various controversies regarding prestigious buildings being planned in Japan. At first he opened an architectural office in Tokyo, and worked to popularize low cost steel frame construction methods, but met with opposition from Kingo Tatsuno, and in 1901 he moved to Yokohama to establish , which specialized in architectural and building services exclusive to the foreign expatriate community.

In 1918, he strongly opposed the Westernised design of the planned Diet Building, and instead proposed a design in a style he called Teikan-heigo, or 'Imperial Crown Eclecticism'. This style combined a Western Neoclassical facade, with a roof style derived from those on Japanese temples and shrines. His proposal for the competition was rejected, so he submitted a design directly to the Diet. This was also rejected, and the competition was won by Fuzuko Watanabe. During this period, Shimoda was also involved in a dispute over claims about his design proposal for the Imperial Hotel, Tokyo, which was later formally awarded as a commission to Frank Lloyd Wright.

Notable works during this period included The Shanghai Club interior (c. 1910) in Shanghai; and the Hong Kong and Shanghai Bank, Nagasaki Branch (c. 1904).

The Imperial Style prototype
Shimoda's development of the imperial style prototype for the Japanese empire evolved into two variations. The 'Imperial Crown style' has a Beaux Arts style body, with a Japanese style roof; while the 'Asian Renaissance Style' has a modern style body, with a Japanese style roof. There are other differences in detailing which relate to layout and relative symmetry.

Gallery

Notable works
Shanghai Club – interior (c.1910)
Hong Kong and Shanghai Bank, Nagasaki Branch (c.1904)
Tor Hotel (c.1908, demolished in 1950)
Yokohama Yamatecho US Navy Hospital (c.1908)
Commissioned the steel structure of the East Palace
Shanghai General Assembly interior design (c.1912) – now Dongfeng Hotel

Notes

References

Publications 
Ideal Architecture (Japanese title: Shiso to Kenchiku), Shimoda Kikutaro  –  Printed in Tokyo by Seijosha. Published in 1928.

Japanese architects
1866 births
1931 deaths
Imperial Crown Style architecture